Rufus Cheney Jr. was a member of the Wisconsin State Assembly during the 1850 session. He was a Whig.

References

Wisconsin Whigs
19th-century American politicians
Year of birth missing
Year of death missing